Three Oaks may refer to:

 Three Oaks, East Sussex, England
 Three Oaks railway station, East Sussex
 Three Oaks, Florida, USA
 Three Oaks, Michigan, USA
 Three Oaks Township, Michigan, USA